The Trittico di Autunno is an unofficial trio of cycling classics held in October in northern Italy. It is not an official competition like its counterpart, the Trittico Lombardo. Three one day races, Milano–Torino, Giro del Piemonte and Giro di Lombardia, are held within a 4-day timeframe in the Lombardy and Piedmont regions. Before 1987, Milano–Torino was organized in the spring, which was also the case in 2005, 2006 and 2007.

Cycle races in Italy
Recurring sporting events established in 1987
1987 establishments in Italy
Men's road bicycle races